Vann Peak is a small but prominent bare rock peak (2,140 m) which is the central and dominant feature of three aligned peaks at the west end of Ohio Range. It was surveyed by the United States Antarctic Research Program (USARP) Horlick Mountains Traverse party in December 1958, and was named by the Advisory Committee on Antarctic Names (US-ACAN) for Charlie E. Vann, the chief of the photogrammetry unit responsible for Antarctic maps in the Branch of Special Maps, U.S. Geological Survey.

Mountains of Marie Byrd Land